William Birkbeck may refer to:

 William Henry Birkbeck (1863–1929), British Army officer and administrator
 William Lloyd Birkbeck (1806–1888), English legal scholar